Basa (variation: Jabal Basa) is a village in Sudan. Near Basa is a completely decayed temple which was excavated in 1907. It was built by Amanikhabale and probably dedicated to Apedemak, the lion-headed warrior god worshiped in Nubia by Meroitic peoples. Some fallen lion sculptures, each weighing two tons, were found by Francis Llewellyn Griffith. In 1970, five of the lion sculptures were recovered and placed at the entrance of the National Museum of Sudan, as were two stone frog sculptures. Griffith also excavated a limestone sundial which dates to Roman times.

References
 Hinkel, F. W. (1978). Auszug aus Nubien ("Extract from Nubia"). Berlin: Akademie-Verlag. (in German)

Populated places in River Nile (state)
Archaeological sites in Sudan
Nubian architecture in Sudan
Kingdom of Kush
Populated places established in the 1st century BC
1st-century BC establishments